Euphorbia boivinii is a species of plant in the family Euphorbiaceae. It is endemic to Madagascar.  Its natural habitat is subtropical or tropical moist lowland forests. It is threatened by habitat loss.

The Latin specific epithet of boivinii refers to French explorer and plant collector Louis Hyacinthe Boivin (1808-1852).

References

Endemic flora of Madagascar
boivinii
Least concern plants
Taxonomy articles created by Polbot
Taxa named by Pierre Edmond Boissier